A Joyful Noise Unto The Creator is the second album by United Kingdom acid jazz group Galliano. It was released on Gilles Peterson's Talkin' Loud record label on 8 June 1992. The album reached number 28 in the UK Albums Chart.

Critical reception

The Calgary Herald praised the "good vibes, funkified, reggae-tried, soul-inside rap."

Track listing

Release history

References

1992 albums
Galliano (band) albums
Talkin' Loud albums